A city is one of the units of local government in the Philippines. All Philippine cities are chartered cities, whose existence as corporate and administrative entities is governed by their own specific municipal charters in addition to the Local Government Code of 1991, which specifies their administrative structure and powers. As of December 17, 2022, there are 148 cities.

A city is entitled to at least one representative in the House of Representatives if its population reaches 250,000. Cities are allowed to use a common seal. As corporate entities, cities have the power to take, purchase, receive, hold, lease, convey, and dispose of real and personal property for its general interests, condemn private property for public use (eminent domain), contract and be contracted with, sue and exercise all the powers conferred to it by Congress. Only an Act of Congress can create or amend a city charter, and with this city charter Congress confers on a city certain powers that regular municipalities or even other cities may not have.

Despite the differences in the powers accorded to each city, all cities regardless of status are given a bigger share of the Internal Revenue Allotment (IRA) compared to regular municipalities, as well as being generally more autonomous than regular municipalities.

Government

A city's local government is headed by a mayor elected by popular vote. The vice mayor serves as the presiding officer of the Sangguniang Panlungsod (city council), which serves as the city's legislative body. Upon receiving their charters, cities also receive a full complement of executive departments to better serve their constituents. Some departments are established on a case-by-case basis, depending on the needs of the city.

Offices and officials common to all cities

Source: Local Government Code of 1991.

Subdivisions
Cities, like municipalities, are composed of barangays (Brgy), which can range from urban neighborhoods (such as Barangay 9, Santa Angela in Laoag), to rural communities (such as Barangay Iwahig in Puerto Princesa). Barangays are sometimes grouped into officially defined administrative (geographical) districts. Examples of such are the cities of Manila (16 districts), Davao (11 districts), Iloilo (seven districts), and Samal (three districts: Babak, Kaputian and Peñaplata). Some cities such as Caloocan, Manila and Pasay even have an intermediate level between the district and barangay levels, called a zone. However, geographic districts and zones are not political units; there are no elected city government officials in these city-specific administrative levels. Rather they only serve to make city planning, statistics-gathering and other administrative tasks easier and more convenient.

Classification

Income classification 
Cities are classified according to average annual income of the city based on the previous four calendar years. Effective July 28, 2008, the thresholds for the income classes for cities are:

Legal classification 
The Local Government Code of 1991 (Republic Act No. 7160) classifies all cities into one of three legal categories:

Highly urbanized cities (HUC): Cities with a minimum population of two hundred thousand (200,000) inhabitants, as certified by the Philippine Statistics Authority, and with the latest annual income of at least fifty million pesos (50,000,000 or USD 1,000,000) based on 1991 constant prices, as certified by the city treasurer.

There are currently 33 highly urbanized cities in the Philippines, 16 of which are located in Metro Manila.

Independent component cities (ICC): Cities of this type have charters that explicitly prohibit their residents from voting for provincial officials. All five of them are considered independent from the province in which they are geographically located: Cotabato, Dagupan, Naga (Camarines Sur), Ormoc, and Santiago.
Component cities (CC): Cities which do not meet the preceding requirements are deemed part of the province in which they are geographically located. If a component city is located along the boundaries of two or more provinces, it shall be considered part of the province of which it used to be a municipality.

All but five of the remaining cities are considered component cities.

Independent cities

There are 38 independent cities in the Philippines, all of which are classified as either "Highly urbanized" or "Independent component" cities. A city classified as such:
 does not have its Sangguniang Panlungsod legislation subject to review by any province's Sangguniang Panlalawigan;
 does not share tax revenue with any province; and
 is directly supervised by the President of the Philippines through the city government (given that the provincial government no longer exercises supervision over city officials), as stated in Section 29 of the Local Government Code.

Currently, there are only four independent cities in two classes that can still participate in the election of provincial officials (governor, vice governor, and Sangguniang Panlalawigan members):
 Cities declared highly urbanized between 1987 and 1992, whose charters (as amended) explicitly permitted residents to both vote and run for elective positions in the provincial government, and therefore allowed by Section 452-c of the Local Government Code to maintain these rights: Lucena (Quezon), Mandaue (Cebu);
 Independent component cities whose charters (as amended) only explicitly allow residents to run for provincial offices: Dagupan (Pangasinan) and Naga (Camarines Sur)

Registered voters of the cities of Cotabato, Ormoc, Santiago, as well as all other highly urbanized cities, including those to be converted or created in the future, cannot participate in provincial elections.

In addition to the eligibility of some independent cities to vote in provincial elections, a few other situations become sources of confusion regarding the complete autonomy of independent cities from provinces:
 Some independent cities still serve as the seat of government for the province in which they are geographically located: Bacolod (Negros Occidental), Cagayan de Oro (Misamis Oriental), Cebu City (Cebu), Iloilo City (Iloilo), Lucena (Quezon), Puerto Princesa (Palawan) and Tacloban (Leyte). In such cases, the provincial government, apart from already financing the maintenance of its properties such as provincial government buildings and offices, may also provide the government of the independent city with an annual budget (determined by the province at its discretion) to aid in relieving incidental costs incurred by the city such as road maintenance due to increased vehicular traffic in the vicinity of the provincial government complex.
 Some independent cities are still grouped with their former provinces for the purposes of representation in Congress. While 24 independent cities have their own representative(s) in Congress, some remain part of the congressional representation of the province to which they formerly belonged: Butuan, for example, is still part of the 1st congressional district of Agusan del Norte. In cases like this, independent cities that do not vote for provincial officials are excluded from Sangguniang Panlalawigan (provincial council) districts, and the allotment of SP members is adjusted accordingly by the Commission on Elections (COMELEC) with proper consideration of population. For example, Agusan del Norte (being a third income-class province) is entitled to elect eight members to its Sangguniang Panlalawigan, and belongs to two congressional districts. The seats of the Sangguniang Panlalawigan are not evenly distributed (4–4) between the province's first and second congressional districts because its 1st district contains Butuan, an independent city which does not vote for provincial officials. Rather, the seats are distributed 1–7 to account for the small population of the province's 1st Sangguniang Panlalawigan district (consisting only of Las Nieves) and the bulk of the province's population being in the second district. On the other hand, the city of Lucena, which is eligible to vote for provincial officials, still forms part of the province of Quezon's 2nd Sangguniang Panlalawigan district, which is coterminous with the 2nd congressional district of Quezon.
 General lack of distinction for independent cities, for practical purposes: Many government agencies, as well as Philippine society in general, still continue to classify many independent cities outside Metro Manila as part of provinces due to historical and cultural ties, especially if these cities were once or currently socio-economic and cultural capitals of the provinces to which they once belonged. Furthermore, most maps of the Philippines showing provincial boundaries almost never separate independent cities from the provinces in which they are geographically located, for cartographic convenience. Despite being first-level administrative divisions (i.e., on the same level as provinces, as stated in Section 25 of the LGC), independent cities are still treated by many to be on the same level as municipalities and component cities (second-level administrative divisions) for educational convenience and simplicity.

A component city, while enjoying relative autonomy on some matters compared to a regular municipality, is still considered part of a province. However, there are several sources of confusion:
 Some component cities form their own congressional representation, separate from their province. The representation of a city in the House of Representatives (or lack thereof) is not a criterion for independence from a province, as Congress is the national legislative body and is part of the national (central) government. Despite Antipolo, Biñan and San Jose del Monte having their own representatives in Congress, they are still component cities of Rizal, Laguna, and Bulacan, respectively, as their respective charters specifically converted them into component cities and have no provision stating a severance in relations with their respective provincial governments.
 Being part of an administrative region different from the province: Isabela City functions as a component city of Basilan: its tax revenues are shared with the provincial government, its residents are eligible to both vote and run for provincial offices, and it is served by the provincial government and the Sangguniang Panlalawigan of Basilan with regard to provincially devolved services. However, by opting out of joining the Bangsamoro Autonomous Region in Muslim Mindanao (BARMM), Isabela City's residents are ineligible to vote and run for regional offices of the Bangsamoro Parliament, unlike the rest of Basilan. Regional services provided to Isabela City come from offices in Region IX based in Pagadian; the rest of Basilan is serviced by the BARMM based in Cotabato City. Isabela City, while not independent from its province, is this outside the jurisdiction of the BARMM, the region to which the rest of Basilan belongs. Regions are not the primary subnational administrative divisions of the Philippines, but rather the provinces.

Creation of cities
Congress is the lone legislative entity that can incorporate cities. Provincial and municipal councils can pass resolutions indicating a desire to have a certain area (usually an already-existing municipality or a cluster of barangays) declared a city after the requirements for becoming a city are met. As per Republic Act No. 9009, these requirements include:
 locally generated income of at least 100 million (based on constant prices in the year 2000) for the last two consecutive years, as certified by the Department of Finance, or
 a population of at least 150,000, as certified by the Philippine Statistics Authority (PSA), or a contiguous territory of 100 square kilometers, as certified by the Land Management Bureau, with contiguity not being a requisite for areas that are on two or more islands.
Republic Act No. 11683 further amended Section 450 of the Local Government Code in 2022, exempting a municipality qualified for cityhood from attaining the land or population threshold if the first requirement above is met.

Members of Congress (usually the involving representative of the congressional district to which the proposed city belongs) then draft the legislation that will convert or create the city. After the bill passes through both the House of Representatives and the Senate and becomes an Act of Congress, the President signs the Act into law. If the Act goes unsigned after 30 days it still becomes law despite the absence of the President's signature.

The creation of cities before 1983 was solely at the discretion of the national legislature; there were no requirements for achieving 'city' status other than an approved city charter. No income, population or land area requirements had to be met in order to incorporate cities before Batas Pambansa Bilang 337 (Local Government Code of 1983) became law. This is what made it possible for several current cities such as Tangub or Canlaon to be conferred such a status despite their small population and locally generated income, which do not meet current standards. The relatively low income standard between 1992 and 2001 (which was 20 million) also allowed several municipalities, such as Sipalay and Muñoz, to become cities despite not being able to meet the current 100 million local income standard.

Before 1987, many cities were created without any plebiscites conducted for the residents to ratify the city charter, most notable of which were cities that were incorporated during the early American colonial period (Manila and Baguio), and during the Commonwealth Era (1935–1946) such as Cavite City, Dansalan (now Marawi), Iloilo City, Bacolod, San Pablo and Zamboanga City. Only since 1987 has it been mandated under the Constitution that any change to the legal status of any local government unit requires the ratification by the residents that would be affected by such changes. Therefore, all cities created after 1987 – after meeting the requirements for cityhood as laid out in the Local Government Code of 1991 and Republic Act No. 9009 of 2001 – only acquired their corporate status after the majority of their voting residents approved their respective charters.

Motivations for cityhood
Although some early cities were given charters because of their advantageous (Baguio, Tagaytay) or strategic (Angeles City and Olongapo, Cotabato, Zamboanga) locations or in order to especially establish new government centers in otherwise sparsely populated areas (Palayan, Trece Martires, Quezon City), most Philippine cities were originally incorporated to provide a form of localized civil government to an area that is primarily urban, which, due to its compact nature and different demography and local economy, cannot be necessarily handled more efficiently by more rural-oriented provincial and municipal governments. However, not all cities are purely areas of dense urban settlement. To date there are still cities with huge expanses of rural or wilderness areas and considerable non-urban populations, such as Calbayog, Davao, Puerto Princesa and Zamboanga as they were deliberately incorporated with increased future resource needs and urban expansion, as well as strategic considerations, in mind.

With the enactment of the 1991 Local Government Code, municipalities and cities have both become more empowered to deal with local issues. Regular municipalities now share many of the same powers and responsibilities as chartered cities, but its citizens and/or leaders may feel that it might be to their best interest to get a larger share of internal revenue allotment (IRA) and acquire additional powers by becoming a city, especially if the population has greatly increased and local economy has become more robust. On the other hand, due to the higher property taxes that would be imposed after cityhood, many citizens have become wary of their town's conversion into a city, even if the municipality had already achieved a high degree of urbanization and has an annual income that already exceeds that of many existing lower-income cities. This has been among the cases made against the cityhood bids of many high-income and populous municipalities surrounding Metro Manila, most notably Bacoor and Dasmariñas (which finally became cities in June 2012 and November 2009 respectively), which for many years have been more qualified to become cities than others.

In response to the rapid increase in the number of municipalities being converted into cities since the enactment of the Local Government Code in 1991, Senator Aquilino Pimentel authored what became Republic Act No. 9009 in June 2001 which sought to establish a more appropriate benchmark by which municipalities that wished to become cities were to be measured. The income requirement was increased sharply from 20 million to 100 million in a bid to curb the spate of conversions into cities of municipalities that were perceived to have not become urbanized or economically developed enough to be able to properly function as a city.

Despite the passage of RA 9009, 16 municipalities not meeting the required locally generated income were converted into cities in 2007 by seeking exemption from the income requirement. This led to vocal opposition from the League of Cities of the Philippines against the cityhood of these municipalities, with the League arguing that by letting these municipalities become cities, Congress will set "a dangerous precedent" that would not prevent others from seeking the same "special treatment". More importantly, the LCP argued that with the recent surge in the conversion of towns that did not meet the requirements set by RA 9009 for becoming cities, the allocation received by existing cities would only drastically decrease because more cities will have to share the amount allotted by the national government, which is equal to 23% of the IRA, which in turn is 40% of all the revenues collected by the Bureau of Internal Revenue. The resulting legal battles resulted in the nullification of the city charters of the 16 municipalities by the Supreme Court in August 2010. (See #"League of 16" and legal battles)

Changing city status
Throughout the years there have been instances of changes to the city's status with regard to eligibility for provincial elections, as a result of the passage of laws, both of general effectivity and specific to a city.

Before 1979 
Prior to 1979, all cities were just considered chartered cities, without any official category differentiating them aside from income levels. Though chartered cities were considered autonomous from the provinces from which they were created, the eligibility of their residents to vote for provincial officials was determined by their respective charters.

Regarding participation in provincial affairs, there were three types of city charters: 
 those which explicitly allowed their respective residents to elect provincial officials,
 those which explicitly prohibited participation in provincial elections,
 and those which are silent regarding voter participation in provincial elections.
The 1951 Supreme Court decision on Teves, et al. v. Commission on Elections finally resolved the ambiguity surrounding the third category of cities, by confirming that the residents of cities with such charters (such as Dumaguete and Davao City) are ineligible to participate in provincial elections.

Altering the right of city residents to participate in provincial elections was a power solely determined by the national legislature. Before 1979, this power was exercised in seven cases, affecting a total of six cities:
 Five Acts of the National Assembly or Congress in which the residents of an existing city were restored the right to vote for officials of the mother province:
 August 22, 1940: Section 7 of the revised charter of the city of Iloilo (Commonwealth Act No. 158) was amended in 1940 by Commonwealth Act No. 604 to explicitly state: "The voters of said City of Iloilo shall take part in the election of the provincial officers of Iloilo, but the latter shall have no jurisdiction over the City of Iloilo and the officers thereof."
 June 10, 1950: The original city charter of Dagupan (Republic Act No. 170) was originally silent on the matter of the eligibility of city residents to participate in provincial election, therefore implying that residents were ineligible to participate in provincial elections. Three years later Republic Act No. 448 amended the charter to explicitly empower the city's voters to participate in the election of the governor and provincial board members of Pangasinan.
 June 14, 1956: The city of Cabanatuan was originally explicitly excluded from electing and being elected into positions in the provincial government of Nueva Ecija until its original city charter (Republic Act No. 526) was amended by Republic Act No. 1445 in 1956, which enabled the city's residents to once more vote for provincial officials.
 June 16, 1956: The original city charter of Dansalan (Commonwealth Act No. 592) was originally silent on the matter of the eligibility of city residents to participate in provincial election, therefore implying that residents were ineligible to participate in provincial elections. Sixteen years later Republic Act No. 1552, in addition to renaming the city to Marawi, also amended the city charter to explicitly empower the city's voters to participate in the election of Lanao Province officials.
 June 10, 1964: Cebu City's old charter (Commonwealth Act No. 58) was repealed, and replaced with Republic Act No. 3857 in 1964. The law allowed the city's residents to once more become eligible to vote for officials in the provincial government of Cebu.
 June 21, 1969: Following the Supreme Court decision on Teves, et al. v. Commission on Elections which upheld Dumaguete's independence from Negros Oriental, Republic Act No. 5797 was enacted on June 21, 1969, by Congress to revise the city's original charter (Republic Act No. 327) to explicitly allow the city's residents to once again vote for provincial officials.
 One Act of Congress in which the residents of existing cities whose residents were previously explicitly granted the right to participate in provincial elections were deprived such a right:
 June 19, 1959: By virtue of Section 2 of Republic Act No. 2259, the voters of the cities of Dagupan and Iloilo were deprived of the right to participate in provincial elections.

1979–1983
Batas Pambansa Bilang 51, approved on December 22, 1979, introduced two legal categories of cities: highly urbanized cities (HUCs) and component cities. COMELEC Resolution No. 1421, which was issued to implement the provisions of BP 51 prior to the January 30, 1980, local elections, stated that a total of 20 cities were not allowed to participate in the election of provincial officials: seven of these were "highly urbanized," while the remaining 13 were "component" cities.
 When Batas Pambansa Bilang 51 came into effect for the January 30, 1980, elections, all cities whose incomes at the time were 40 million or higher were considered highly urbanized cities. Cities that met this income requirement at the time were: Caloocan, Cebu, Davao, Manila, Pasay and Quezon City. Regardless of whether their respective charters allowed them to vote for provincial officials or not, highly urbanized cities were no longer allowed to vote for provincial officials. Among the aforementioned, only the voters of Cebu City lost the right to participate in provincial elections in this manner; the voters of the other five cities have not participated in any provincial election since their respective incorporation as cities. In addition, Section 3 of BP 51 also made Baguio a highly urbanized city irrespective of its income, due to its importance as the host to the official summer residences of the President and the Supreme Court. A Supreme Court case decided two days before election day upheld the legality of BP 51 in depriving the voters of Cebu City the power to elect officials for the province of Cebu.
 Per Section 3 of BP 51, all other cities were considered "component cities" of the provinces in which they are geographically located, or the provinces of which they were originally a part. Despite considering all other cities as part of their respective provinces, under BP 51 the eligibility of voters to participate in provincial elections were still determined by their cities' respective charters (as amended). The voters of a total of thirteen "component cities" continued to be ineligible to vote for provincial officials for the local elections of 1980. Nine of these were cities with charters (as amended) that expressly prohibited participation in provincial elections: Dagupan, General Santos, Iloilo, Mandaue, Naga, Ormoc, Oroquieta, San Carlos (Pangasinan) and Zamboanga. The remaining four — Bais, Canlaon, Cotabato and Ozamiz — were cities whose charters were silent on participation in provincial elections; BP 51 upheld the 1951 Supreme Court decision on Teves, et al. v. Commission on Elections by barring their residents from participating in the election of provincial officials.

1983–1987 
Batas Pambansa Bilang 337 (Local Government Code of 1983), approved on February 10, 1983, further refined the criteria by which cities can be classified as highly urbanized cities. Under BP 337 a city that had at least 150,000 inhabitants and an income of at least 30 million was to be declared highly urbanized by the Minister of Local Government within thirty days of the city having met the requirement. The cities of Angeles (October 13, 1986), Bacolod (September 27, 1984), Butuan (February 7, 1985), Cagayan de Oro, Iligan (both November 22, 1983), Olongapo (December 7, 1983), and Zamboanga (November 22, 1983) became HUCs in this manner. The residents in most of these cities lost their right to participate in provincial elections for the first time. The two exceptions are: Iloilo City, which had already been deprived of the right to vote for provincial officials in 1959 by virtue of Section 2 of RA 2259, and Zamboanga City, which had been autonomously governed since its creation by virtue of Section 47 of its city charter (Commonwealth Act No. 39).

By virtue of Section 30 of Batas Pambansa Bilang 881 (Omnibus Election Code of the Philippines), approved on December 3, 1985, provided that: "unless their respective charters provide otherwise, the electorate of component cities shall be entitled to vote in the election for provincial officials of the province of which it is a part." This provision therefore overrides the 1951 Supreme Court decision on Teves, et al. v. Commission on Elections by providing voters in component cities whose charters are silent on the matter of electing provincial officials the right to again participate in provincial elections. BP 881 therefore again enfranchised voters in the cities of Bais and Canlaon (Negros Oriental), and Ozamiz (Misamis Occidental). Despite the charter of the city of Cotabato being silent on the matter of electing provincial officials, the city was not legislated to be part of any of the successor provinces of the old undivided Cotabato province. Voters of the city therefore were still not eligible to vote in the provincial elections of either Maguindanao or North Cotabato and therefore remained independent from any province.

1987–1991
The period between ratification of the new Constitution (February 1987) and the effectivity of the Local Government Code of 1991 (January 1992) was one of transition. During this time, BP 51, BP 337 and BP 881 were still in force: the only legal classes of cities during this period were still "highly urbanized" and "component" cities.

Altering the right of city residents to participate in provincial elections was once again exercised by the newly restored Congress in this period. A total of three cities were affected: Republic Acts Nos. 6641 (in 1987), 6726 (in 1989) and 6843 (in 1990), once again allowed the residents of Mandaue, Oroquieta and San Carlos to vote for provincial officials of Cebu, Misamis Occidental and Pangasinan respectively. Since BP 51—which only considered cities as being either "highly urbanized" or "component"—was still in force at the time, the changes were not considered as switching between legal categories, but rather a simple change within the "component city" classification that did not require a plebiscite. Note that the "independent component city" legal classification was only introduced through the Local Government Code in 1992.

Under the same criteria set in BP 337 (Local Government Code of 1983), a total of three cities became highly urbanized: General Santos (September 5, 1988), Lucena (July 1, 1991) and Mandaue (February 15, 1991). Lucena and Mandaue were special cases, in that because their re-classification into HUC status took place after the ratification of the Constitution (February 11, 1987) but before the effectivity of the Local Government Code of 1991 (January 1, 1992), their residents were allowed to continue to participate in the election of provincial officials as per their respective charters (as amended), by virtue of Section 452-c of the LGC. Residents of General Santos were already excluded from voting for provincial officials of South Cotabato since achieving cityhood in 1968; they were therefore unaffected by this exemption.

1992–present
The Local Government Code of 1991 came into effect on January 1, 1992, and has remained in force ever since, though some amendments have been made. New requirements for creating cities, and upgrading cities to highly urbanized status, were instituted under this Act. The LGC of 1991 was also the first time the independent component city (ICC) category was introduced. These cities are those non-highly urbanized cities whose charters explicitly prohibited city residents to vote in provincial elections. They were finally made completely independent of the province from fiscal, administrative and legal standpoints.

Upgrading
Independent municipality to highly urbanized city
The municipalities of Metro Manila, having been severed from the provinces of Bulacan and Rizal and made independent units in 1975, were converted to highly urbanized cities, beginning in 1994 with Mandaluyong. The most recent, Navotas, became an HUC in 2007. Only Pateros, which does not currently meet the population requirement of 200,000 inhabitants, remains the only independent municipality in Metro Manila.

Component city to independent component city (CC - ICC)
All that is needed is a congressional amendment to a component city's charter, prohibiting city residents to vote for provincial officials.

Component/independent component city to highly urbanized city (CC/ICC - HUC)
Since 1992, once a city reaches a population of 200,000 persons as certified by the Philippine Statistics Authority and an income of 50 million (based on 1991 constant prices) as certified by the city treasurer, the city government can submit a request to the President to have their city declared as highly urbanized within 30 days. Upon the President's declaration, a plebiscite will be held within a specific timeframe to ratify this conversion. There are no limits as to the number of times a component city can attempt to become a highly urbanized city, should previous tries be unsuccessful.
 Since 1992 three component cities have been successfully converted into HUCs:
 Puerto Princesa (2007): Proclamation No. 1264 signed on March 26, 2007, declared the capital city of Palawan an HUC. Majority of the votes cast in a plebiscite held on July 21, 2007, approved the conversion.
 Lapu-Lapu (2007): Proclamation No. 1222 signed on January 23, 2007, declared the component city of Lapu-Lapu an HUC. Majority of the votes cast in a plebiscite held on July 21, 2007, approved the conversion.
 Tacloban (2008): Proclamation No. 1637 signed on October 4, 2008, declared the capital city of Leyte an HUC. Majority of the votes cast in a plebiscite held on December 18, 2008, approved the conversion.
 The following component cities failed to become HUCs, for various reasons:
 Cabanatuan (1997): Proclamation No. 969 signed on February 13, 1997, declared the former capital of the province of Nueva Ecija an HUC. Majority of the votes cast in a plebiscite held simultaneously with the barangay elections on May 12, 1997 did not approve the conversion.
 Tarlac City (2005): Proclamation No. 940 signed on October 27, 2005, declared the capital city of the province of Tarlac an HUC. Majority of the votes cast in a plebiscite held on February 11, 2006, did not approve the conversion.
 Antipolo (2011): Proclamation No. 124 signed on March 14, 2011, declared the capital city of the province of Rizal an HUC. On April 4, 2011, Antipolo's city mayor announced that the planned June 18, 2011, plebiscite is indefinitely postponed, effectively suspending the bid to convert the city into an HUC.
 Cabanatuan (2012): Proclamation No. 418 signed on July 4, 2012, once again declared the former capital of the province of Nueva Ecija an HUC. The plebiscite was originally set for December 1, 2012, but, due to preparations for the upcoming 2013 national, ARMM and local elections, was rescheduled by the COMELEC for January 25, 2014. A week before the rescheduled plebiscite, the Supreme Court issued a temporary restraining order, which postponed the vote until the case brought by Nueva Ecija governor Aurelio Umali was decided. On April 22, 2014, the Supreme Court ordered the Commission to include the rest of Nueva Ecija in the plebiscite, given that the province's income will be significantly affected once Cabanatuan attains autonomy as an HUC. The Commission subsequently rescheduled the expanded plebiscite for November 8, 2014. However, on October 21 it issued Minute Resolution No. 14-0732, which suspended the voting until the city government of Cabanatuan provides the 101 million needed to administer the expanded plebiscite.

Downgrading

Highly urbanized city to component city
Reclassifying an HUC as a component city likely involves not only amending the concerned city's charter, but also the Local Government Code, as currently there is no provision in the LGC that allows this, nor are there any precedents. Some Cebu City politicians have previously indicated that they wish to bring back the city under the province's control, in order to bring in more votes against the Sugbuak, the proposed partition of Cebu Province.

Independent component city to component city
A congressional amendment to the city charter enabling city residents to vote for provincial officials is required, followed by a plebiscite. Santiago's status as an independent component city was briefly in question after the enactment of Republic Act No. 8528 on February 14, 1998, which sought to make it a regular component city. The Supreme Court on September 16, 1999, however ruled in favor of the city's mayor who contended that such a change in the status of the city required a plebiscite just like any other merger, division, abolition or alteration in boundaries of any political unit. And due to the lack of a plebiscite to affirm such a change, RA 8528 was therefore unconstitutional.

Amendments
On April 10, 2022, the Republic Act No. 11683 lapsed into law which seeks to ease conversion of towns into cities but was signed by President Rodrigo Duterte on April 11. The new cityhood law amended Section 450 of the Local Government Code where a municipality will be exempted from the land and population requirements if it generates at least 100 million pesos for two consecutive years.

League of Cities of the Philippines (LCP)
The League of Cities of the Philippines (LCP) is a non-profit organization and is not a government agency and was founded in 1988. As of December 17, 2022, the league has a membership of 148 cities. The organization was formed to help coordinate efforts to improve governance and local autonomy and to tackle issues such as preserving the environment and improving public works.

List of cities

, there are 148 cities in the Philippines. Baliwag in Bulacan is the newest city, after the plebiscite held resulted in approval of ratification on December 17, 2022.

Largest cities

Metropolitan areas

City facts
 By population (2020 census figures)
 Smallest: Palayan (45,383)
 Largest: Quezon City (2,960,048)
 By population density (calculated using 2020 census figures):
 Most densely populated: Manila, with 41,515 people per square kilometer
 Most sparsely populated: Puerto Princesa, with 130 people per square kilometer
 By land area:
 Smallest: San Juan, with an area of 
Contrary to popular belief within the Philippines, Davao City does not hold the record of being the world's largest city in terms of land area.
 By elevation:
 Lowest: Most Philippine cities are located on sea level. However, some parts of Navotas, South Caloocan and Malabon are below sea level, and continue to experience subsidence.
However, the peak of Mount Apo, the tallest mountain in the Philippines, forms part of Davao City's boundary with the municipality of Bansalan, Davao del Sur; the city of Digos encompasses a section of the Mount Apo Natural Park as well.
 Most extreme points:
 Northernmost: Laoag
 Southernmost: General Santos
 Easternmost: Bislig
 Westernmost: Puerto Princesa

Defunct/dissolved cities
 Legazpi City (1948–1954): Legazpi's cityhood was approved on June 18, 1948. Under Republic Act No. 306, Legazpi became a city after the President of the Philippines proclaimed its cityhood. Comprising the present-day territories of Legazpi City and Daraga, the city was dissolved on June 8, 1954 when Legazpi and Daraga were made into separate municipalities. Legazpi eventually became a city on its own on June 12, 1959.
 Basilan City (1948–1973): Formerly part of the city of Zamboanga until it was made a city on its own in 1948 through Republic Act No. 288. Delimited to only the downtown area of what is now Isabela City upon the creation of the province of Basilan in 1973 through Presidential Decree No. 356 by President Ferdinand Marcos. Finally abolished and its territory annexed to the municipality of Isabela on November 7, 1975, through Presidential Decree No. 840.
 Rajah Buayan City (1966): Under Republic Act No. 4413, the then-municipality of General Santos in what was then the unified province of Cotabato was to be formally converted into a city named after a historical ruler in Mindanao on January 1, 1966, provided that majority of qualified voters in the municipality vote in favor of cityhood in a plebiscite. In December 1965 the Commission on Elections (COMELEC) proclaimed the cityhood of Rajah Buayan, with 4,422 people voting for and 3,066 voting against. However, two residents of the new city challenged this by arguing in the courts that the number of people who voted in favor of cityhood did not form a majority in light of the fact that there were 15,727 voters in the city. The court issued an injunction on January 4, 1966, restraining city officers from performing any acts authorized by or pursuant to provisions in RA 4413. The Supreme Court unanimously upheld this decision on October 29, 1966, and declared that the city charter was not accepted by majority of voters, thus rendering RA 4413 null and void. The municipality of General Santos would later be converted into a city under the same name in 1968.

"League of 16" and legal battles
The Supreme Court of the Philippines, by a highly divided vote of 6–5, on November 18, 2008, subsequently upheld with finality on May 6, 2009, declared unconstitutional cityhood laws converting 16 municipalities into cities. The 24-page judgment of Justice Antonio T. Carpio, adjudged that the following cityhood laws violate secs. 6 and 10, Article X of the Constitution of the Philippines:
RA No. 9389 (Baybay, Leyte)
RA No. 9390 (Bogo, Cebu)
RA No. 9391 (Catbalogan, Samar)
RA No. 9392 (Tandag, Surigao del Sur)
RA No. 9393 (Lamitan, Basilan)
RA No. 9394 (Borongan, Eastern Samar)
RA No. 9398 (Tayabas, Quezon)
RA No. 9404 (Tabuk, Kalinga)
RA No. 9405 (Bayugan, Agusan del Sur)
RA No. 9407 (Batac,Ilocos Norte)
RA No. 9408 (Mati, Davao Oriental)
RA No. 9409 (Guihulngan, Negros Oriental)
RA No. 9434 (Cabadbaran, Agusan del Norte)
RA No. 9435 (El Salvador, Misamis Oriental)
RA No. 9436 (Carcar, Cebu)
RA No. 9491 (Naga, Cebu)

The Court held that the foregoing cityhood laws, all enacted after RA 9009's effectivity, "explicitly exempt respondent municipalities from the increased income requirement from 20 million to 100 million in Section 450 of the Local Government Code (LGC), as amended by RA 9009. Such exemption clearly violates Section 10, Article X of the Constitution and is thus patently unconstitutional. To be valid, such exemption must be written in the Local Government Code and not in any other law, including the Cityhood Laws."

However, more than a year later, on December 22, 2009, acting on the appeal of the so-called League of 16 Cities (an informal group consisting of the sixteen local government units whose cityhood status had been reversed), the Supreme Court reversed its earlier ruling as it ruled that "at the end of the day, the passage of the amendatory law (regarding the criteria for cityhood as set by Congress) is no different from the enactment of a law, i.e., the cityhood laws specifically exempting a particular political subdivision from the criteria earlier mentioned. Congress, in enacting the exempting law/s, effectively decreased the already codified indicators." As such, the cityhood status of the said 16 LGUs was effectively restored.

On August 24, 2010, in a 16-page resolution, the Supreme Court reinstated its November 18, 2008, decision striking down the cityhood laws, reducing once more the sixteen LGUs to the status of regular municipalities.

The most recent development in the legal battles surrounding the League of 16 came on February 15, 2011. Voting 7–6, the Supreme Court (SC) ruled that 16 towns that became cities in 2007 can stay as cities. This was the fourth time the SC has ruled on the case, and the third reversal. It said the conversion of the 16 towns into cities met all legal requirements.

Rejected cityhood

 Batangas (1965): A majority of the votes cast in the then-municipality of Batangas rejected cityhood in a plebiscite conducted on the same day as the 1965 Philippine general elections, as mandated by Republic Act No. 4586. The city would have been named Laurel City in honor of Jose P. Laurel, the president of the Japanese-sponsored Second Republic. The municipality of Batangas would later be converted into a city under the same name in 1969.
 Tarlac (1969): The city charter of Tarlac (Republic Act No. 5907) was approved on June 21, 1969. Cityhood was rejected in a plebiscite held on November 11, 1969, by a majority of the ballots cast. Tarlac became a city 29 years after, in 1998.
 Taguig (1998): Republic Act No. 8487, Taguig was supposed to be converted into a highly urbanized city but it was rejected due to lower income. More than six years later, the cityhood of Taguig was ratified with majority of the ballots cast votes in a plebiscite held on December 8, 2004.
 Ilagan (1999): Republic Act No. 8474, which converted Ilagan to a component city of Isabela, was approved on February 2, 1998. However, majority of votes cast in the plebiscite held on March 14, 1999, rejected cityhood. Ilagan finally became a city after majority of votes cast in the August 11, 2012, plebiscite approved the Republic Act No. 10169.
 Novaliches (1999): On February 23, 1998, the controversial City Charter of Novaliches (Republic Act No. 8535) was approved, which sought to create a new city out of the 15 northern barangays of Quezon City. Historically a separate town, Novaliches was distributed between Quezon City and northern Caloocan in 1948. In a plebiscite held on October 23, 1999, the majority of ballots cast (which included all voters of Quezon City and not just the 15 barangays) rejected the cityhood of Novaliches.
 Meycauayan (2001): Cityhood was rejected by majority of the votes cast in a plebiscite held on March 30, 2001, to ratify Republic Act No. 9021. Meycauayan became a city five years later with the enactment of Republic Act No. 9356 and its ratification through a plebiscite on December 10, 2006.

Proposed cities under the 18th Congress
 Talavera, Nueva Ecija: House Bill No. 194 and Senate Bill No. 2040
 Daraga, Albay: House Bill No. 1528
 Balamban, Cebu: House Bill No. 1574
 Alabel, Sarangani: House Bill No. 3494
 Ubay, Bohol: House Bill No. 4854
 Liloan, Cebu: House Bill No. 5031 and Senate Bill No. 2007

 Echague, Isabela: House Bill No. 5970 and Senate Bill No. 2067
 Naval, Biliran: House Bill No. 6230
 Bataraza, Palawan: House Bill No. 6278
 La Trinidad, Benguet: House Bill No. 6367
 Polomolok, South Cotabato: House Bill No. 6432
 Capas, Tarlac: House Bill No. 7861
 Capas, Tarlac: House Bill No. 8219
 Manolo Fortich, Bukidnon: House Bill No. 8283 and Senate Bill No. 2038
 Solano, Nueva Vizcaya: House Bill No. 8727
 Bayambang, Pangasinan: House Bill No. 8826
 Malay, Aklan: House Bill No. 9282

Proposed cities under the 19th Congress
 Liloan, Cebu: House Bill No. 99 by Rep. Vincent Franco Frasco
 Balamban, Cebu: House Bill No. 1018 by Rep. Pablo John Garcia
 Carmona, Cavite: House Bill No. 3968 by Rep. Roy Loyola
 Consolacion, Cebu: House Bill No. 1324 by Rep. Daphne Lagon and Sonny "SL" Lagon
 Solano, Nueva Vizcaya: House Bill No. 1736 by Rep. Luisa "Banti" Cuaresma
 Ubay, Bohol: House Bill No. 5203 by Rep. Maria Vanessa C. Aumentado
 Malay, Aklan: House Bill No. 6401 by Rep. Teodorico Herasco Jr

Former names

 Cagayan de Oro: The municipality of Cagayan was converted to the city of Cagayan de Oro in June 15, 1950 through Republic Act No. 521. An earlier bill was filed by Misamis Oriental Congressman Pedro S. Baculio for the creation of the City of Cagayan, however the 1st Congress was adjourned before any readings for the bill had done. The final, and enacted, cityhood bill authored by Congressman (and later Vice President) Emmanuel Pelaez gave the city its present name.
 Lapu-Lapu: The municipality of Opon was converted to a city named after Lapulapu, hero of the Battle of Mactan in 1961 through Republic Act No. 3134.
 Marawi: Inaugurated as the City of Dansalan in 1950, renamed to Marawi on June 16, 1956, through Republic Act No. 1552.
 Ozamiz: The municipality of Misamis was converted to a city named after José Ozámiz, the first governor of Misamis Occidental, in 1948 through Republic Act No. 321.
Pasay: Inaugurated as Rizal City in 1947, reverted to Pasay on June 7, 1950, through Republic Act No. 437.
 Roxas: In 1951, the municipality of Capiz was converted to a city named after Manuel Roxas, the first president of the Third Philippine Republic and town native through Republic Act No. 603.

See also

 Sangguniang Panlungsod
 List of cities in the Philippines
 List of metropolitan areas in the Philippines
 List of cities and municipalities in the Philippines
 List of renamed cities and municipalities in the Philippines

References

External links
 League of Cities of the Philippines (LCP)
 Philippine Clean Cities Project
 CityMayors.com article

 
Philippines 3
Subdivisions of the Philippines